William Armstrong Fallis (1832 – 1903) was an Ontario farmer and political figure. He represented Durham East in the Legislative Assembly of Ontario as a Conservative member from 1894 to 1902.

He was born in Cavan Township, Upper Canada, the son of Irish immigrants, and was educated there. In 1871, he married Mary A. Kinsman. He served five years on the township council.

External links 
The Canadian parliamentary companion, 1897 JA Gemmill
Member's parliamentary history for the Legislative Assembly of Ontario

1832 births
1903 deaths
Progressive Conservative Party of Ontario MPPs